Saboten Con is an annual four-day anime convention held during August/September at the Sheraton Grand Phoenix in Phoenix, Arizona. The convention is held over Labor Day weekend. Its name comes from the Japanese word saboten, meaning "cactus".

Programming
The convention typically offers an anime music video contest, anime screenings, concerts, gaming, masquerade, Japanese fashion show, maid cafes, panels, screenings, steampunk ball, vendors, and workshops. The convention had over 700 hours of programming in 2017.

History
Saboten Con was named the "Best Anime Convention – 2010" by the Phoenix New Times. Saboten Con 2020 was cancelled due to the COVID-19 pandemic. The convention for 2021 had a mask policy.

Event history

Gallery

References

External links
 Saboten Con website

Anime conventions in the United States
Recurring events established in 2008
2008 establishments in Arizona
Annual events in Arizona
Festivals in Phoenix, Arizona
Tourist attractions in Phoenix, Arizona
Conventions in Arizona